Porcelain Bus were an Australian rock and R&B group formed in late 1985 by Ian James on lead vocals, Robert McKiernan on lead guitar and vocals, John Nolan on drums and Paul Patrick on bass guitar. They released two studio albums Talking to God (October 1988) and Fragile (July 1990). After touring Europe in late 1990 they returned to Australia where they toured its east coast before breaking up in 1991.

History 

Porcelain Bus were formed in Sydney in late 1985 by Ian James on lead vocals, Robert McKiernan on lead guitar and vocals, John Nolan on drums and Paul Patrick on bass guitar. James, McKiernan and Patrick were school friends and had formed Mr Pharmacist early in 1985 as a 1960s acid-punk/R&B group. Porcelain Bus were named for a euphemism for vomiting, "driving the porcelain bus".

The group's debut single "Indignation" (August 1986) was produced by Rob Younger. Australian musicologist Ian McFarlane observed that it "defined the band's sound (sparse, melodic guitar and husky vocals laid over a dark, rumbling rhythm section)." Their second single, "The Well is Dry" (July 1987) and a six-track extended play, Steel Bros (1987) were both produced by Brett Myers (of Died Pretty) for Citadel Records. On the EP's lead track "Talk to Me" Astrid Munday guested on backing vocals. Jim Dwyer of Tharunka praised James' "appealing" vocals on "The Well Is Dry" and its use of slide and acoustic guitar. Dwyer found Steel Bros to be an "absolutely excellent a killer record."

Myers also produced their debut studio album Talking to God, which was issued in October 1988. Nostalgia Centrals writer felt it "presented a great mix of strong rockers and softer tracks". It provided two singles "Own Little World" (October) and "Rats" (June 1989). Adam Toole replaced Nolan on drums in November 1989. The group issued their second album Fragile in July 1990, which included the single "Blue on Blue" (June). The album was described by Penelope Layland of The Canberra Times as "excellent" and displaying "rich guitar rock with a '60s edge and a dominant, complex rhythm line." Citadel Records authorised a compilation album Sacred Relics (1990) for release in Europe and the group supported it with a European tour later that year. Upon return to Australia they undertook an east coast tour and disbanded in 1991.

In 1995 Ian James (as Ian Towart) and Rob McKiernan formed Gentle Assassins as a "hard rocknpop and alt.country" five-piece band. Other members were Iain Jepson on keyboards, Andrew Lay on drums and James Lacey on bass guitar and vocals. The group released their debut album They Knew too Much (March 2005) via Endgame Records, which was produced by Shane Fahey.

Members 

 Ian James ( Ian Towart) – lead vocals
 Robert McKiernan – lead guitar, vocals
 John Nolan – drums, vocals
 Paul Patrick – bass guitar
 Adam Toole – drums

Discography

Albums 

 Talking to God (October 1988) – Citadel Records 
 Fragile (July 1990) – Citadel/Festival Records , Blue Mosque 
 Sacred Relics (compilation, 1990) – Citadel , Blue Mosque/Festival Records

Extended plays 

 Steel Bros – Citadel Records

Singles 

 "Indignation" (1986) – Citadel Records 
 "The Well is Dry" (1987) – Citadel Records 
 "Own Little World" (1988) – Citadel Records 
 "Rats" (1989) – Citadel Records 
 "Blue on Blue" (1990) – Blue Mosque Records

References

External links 

 
 "Porcelain Bus" at Divine Rites

Musical groups established in 1985
Musical groups disestablished in 1991
Musical groups from Sydney